Yuzhnouralsk is a town in Chelyabinsk Oblast, Russia, located on the Uvelka River  south of Chelyabinsk. Population:

History
It was founded in 1948. Town status was granted to it on February 1, 1963..  It was one of the towns closest to the hypocenter of the blast from the 2013 Russian meteor event.

Administrative and municipal status
Within the framework of administrative divisions, it is, together with one rural locality, incorporated as the Town of Yuzhnouralsk—an administrative unit with the status equal to that of the districts. As a municipal division, the Town of Yuzhnouralsk is incorporated as Yuzhnouralsky Urban Okrug.

References

Notes

Sources

 Cities and towns in Chelyabinsk Oblast